Chester Elton (born September 22, 1958) is a Canadian-born author who is known for his books, The Orange Revolution and The Carrot Principle. He is the co-founder of The Culture Works.

Career 
Chester Elton is the co-founder of The Culture Works, a training company, and is a board member of Camp Corral, a non-profit for the children of wounded and fallen military personnel.

Elton is co-author of The New York Times, USA Today, and Wall Street Journal bestselling leadership book: All In; The Carrot Principle, and The Best Team Wins. 

He has co-authored books with Adrian Gostick such as Managing with Carrots (1999); and The Carrot Principle (2010). Already as established authors, they have collaborated on two more books: All In (2012) and What Motivates Me (2014). His books have been reviewed by multiple publications.

Bibliography
Managing with Carrots: Using Recognition to Attract and Retain the Best People (with Chester Elton and Adrian Gostick, 2001) 
The 24-Carrot Manager: A Remarkable Story of How a Leader Can Unleash Human Potential (with Chester Elton and Adrian Gostick, 2002) 
A Carrot a Day: A Daily Dose of Recognition for Your Employees (with Chester Elton and Adrian Gostick, 2004) 
The Invisible Employee: Realizing the Hidden Potential in Everyone (with Chester Elton and Adrian Gostick, 2006) 
The Carrot Principle (with Chester Elton and Adrian Gostick, Reissue 2009) 
The Daily Carrot Principle: 365 Ways to Enhance Your Career and Life (with Chester Elton and Adrian Gostick, 2010) 
The Orange Revolution: How One Great Team can Transform an Entire Organization (with Chester Elton and Adrian Gostick, 2010) 
All In: How The Best Managers Create a Culture of Belief and Drive Big Results (with Chester Elton and Adrian Gostick, 2012) 
What Motivates Me: Put Your Passions to Work (with Chester Elton and Adrian Gostick, 2014) 
The Best Team Wins: The New Science of High Performance (with Chester Elton and Adrian Gostick, 2014) 
Leading with Gratitude: Eight Leadership Practices for Extraordinary Business Results (with Chester Elton and Adrian Gostick, 2020)

See also
Adrian Gostick

References

External links
The Culture Works

1958 births
Living people
Canadian business writers